Kemény Castle (Romanian: Castelul Kemény; Hungarian: Kemény-kastély; German: Kemény Schloss), situated at the foot of the Călimani Mountains on the right bank of the Mureș River in Brâncovenești, Mureș County, Romania, is one of the finest examples of Hungarian Renaissance architecture in Transylvania. It was built using the remains of a Roman fortification situated not on the site of today's building but in the adjoining orchard.

History
The first written mention about Brâncovenești was almost eight centuries ago. In this village on the right bank of the Mureş River, on the top of the hill they built a small fort already in Roman times which was destroyed during the migrations. Its name according to inscribed stones which were found in the ground was: Ala Nova Illiricorum. Its few remnants can be seen in the current castle`s former orchard.

The castle was built from Roman stones at the beginning of the 13th century, when the territory belonged to the Kingdom of Hungary. The earliest remaining document from 1228 gives its name as castrum Wecheu, when King Andrew II of Hungary took it from Simon Kacsics and gave it to Denis Tomaj. The ancestors of the Bánffy de Losoncz noble family inherited from them and held it for one and a half centuries. In 1467 the family took part in the rebellion against King Matthias, and thereby they lost their possession. The king gave it to one of his relatives from Hunyad County, John Ongor. It subsequently became the property of the wealthy and influential Michael Szobi. After his death, John Szapolyai gave all the Szobi properties to Stephen Werbőczy.

In the following years the castle changed its owners many times. The sequence began with Ferenc Kendi, one of the leading figures of the time, then Sigismund Báthory left it to his uncle, Bocskai István. Around 1612 the castle became the property of István Wesselényi. The castle was also owned by Gabriel Bethlen, who passed it on to Peter Bethlen, but after his death it went to George I Rákóczi. In that period, the castle owned seven villages: Brȋncoveneşti, Săcalu de Pădure, Luieriu, Vătava, Ideciu de Jos si Ideciu de Sus, Cuieșd, and one part of Suseni. George I Rákóczi meant to give the castle to John Kemény, but only his son George II Rákóczi managed to do it. On 28 November 1648 the castle together with five villages was donated to John Kemény and his descendants.  From this moment Brȋncoveneşti became John Kemény's property for three hundred years.
From the summer of 1926 on, writers of the "Erdélyi Helikon" had their annual meeting in the Castle. At the end of World War II the local population completely ransacked the building, all the valuables were taken. Following its earlier nationalization, it became a reformatory, and it was then converted into a home for women and children with disabilities. As a result, the building was not open for a long time.

On 8 November 2014, the Kemény Castle from Brâncovenești was opened for visitors. Once again, the property has been returned to the Kemény family after a period of 70 years.

Description

The castle has a square-shaped plan, courtyard and corner towers, two larger and two smaller. Several windows have frames in Renaissance style. Built above the entrance is a picturesque stone balcony on consoles. The consoles can be seen at the floors of the towers. The entrance is on the north side, on a bridge over the outside ditch of the castle. Old documents show that the former citadel (13th century) was protected by moats, walls and towers positioned below the plateau on which the castle was built. These were destroyed during post-war reconstruction work.

References

Houses completed in the 16th century
Historic monuments in Mureș County
Castles in Romania